Meadowlark Park is a residential neighbourhood in west Edmonton, Alberta, Canada. Bounded by 95 Avenue to the north, 156 Street to the east, 87 Avenue to the south, and 163 Street to the west, the neighbourhood was originally part of the Town of Jasper Place. It became part of Edmonton in 1964 when Jasper Place amalgamated with the city.

The community is represented by the Meadowlark Community League, established in 1959, which maintains a community hall and outdoor rink located at 159 Street and 92 Avenue.

Demographics 

Residential development 

Nine out of ten residences in the neighbourhood are owner occupied, with the most common type of dwelling being single detached houses.  There are also a number of walk up apartment buildings in the neighbourhood.  Roughly eight out of ten residences were constructed between the end of the Second World War and the 1970s.

Schools 
There are 2 schools in the neighbourhood, Meadowlark Elementary School and Meadowlark Christian School, operated by the Edmonton Public School System.

Shopping and services 
Meadowlark Health and Shopping Centre is located at the south east corner of the neighbourhood at the intersection of 156 Street and 87 Avenue.  The Jasper Place branch of the Edmonton Public Library is located close to the shopping centre as is a fire station.

West Edmonton Mall is located to the west of the neighbourhood along 87 Avenue.

Meadowlark Transit Centre 

The Meadowlark Transit Centre is a small transit centre located on the north side of the Meadowlark Shopping Centre, at 156 Street and Meadowlark Road. There are no amenities at this transit centre.

Following the April 25, 2021 bus network redesign, it is no longer indicated as a transit centre on ETS maps.  It is, however, still served by ETS bus routes.  The following bus routes serve the transit centre:

On-demand transit service to Meadowlark does not use the transit centre, instead using street stops on 156 Street and 87 Avenue. Beginning February 6, 2022, route 924 also uses these stops, as the transit centre is closed for Valley Line West LRT construction.

Surrounding neighbourhoods 
Surrounding neighbourhoods are Lynnwood and Elmwood to the south, Sherwood and Jasper Park to the east, West Jasper Place to the northeast, Glenwood to the north and northwest, and West Meadowlark Park to the west.

See also 
 Edmonton Federation of Community Leagues
 Edmonton Transit Service

References

External links 
Meadowlark Neighbourhood Profile

Neighbourhoods in Edmonton
Edmonton Transit Service transit centres